The 2002–03 Hazfi Cup was the 16th season of the Iranian football knockout competition.

Bracket
Teams from same city meet only once

1/8-final

1/4-final

Semi-final

Final

Leg 1

Leg 2

References

2002
2002–03 domestic association football cups
2002–03 in Iranian football